Pixvae is a corregimiento in Las Palmas District, Veraguas Province, Panama with a population of 820 as of 2010. Its population as of 1990 was 1,103; its population as of 2000 was 883. By 2020, Pixvae has reduced its population to 386.

References

Corregimientos of Veraguas Province